Structural Maintenance of Chromosomes flexible Hinge Domain Containing 1 (SMCHD1) is a protein that in humans is encoded by the SMCHD1 gene. Mutations in SMCHD1 are causative for development of facioscapulohumeral muscular dystrophy type 2 (FSHD2) and Bosma arhinia microphthalmia syndrome (BAMS).

Without maternal SMCHD1 in the egg cell, children bear with altered skeletal structures.

References

Further reading

External links 
 PDBe-KB provides an overview of all the structure information available in the PDB for Structural Maintenance of Chromosomes flexible Hinge Domain Containing 1 (SMCHD1)

Human proteins